Vienna Township is the name of some places in the U.S. state of Michigan:

 Vienna Township, Genesee County, Michigan (Vienna Charter Township, Michigan)
 Vienna Township, Montmorency County, Michigan

See also

 Vienna Township (disambiguation)

Michigan township disambiguation pages